Dave Braggins (January 9, 1945 – July 19, 2004) was a professional Canadian football offensive lineman who played nine seasons in the Canadian Football League for two different teams. He won the Leo Dandurand Trophy in 1975 and also was named CFL All-Star that season, and was a part of three Grey Cup championship teams with the Ottawa Rough Riders in 1968 and 1969, and the Montreal Alouettes in 1974. Braggins played college football at Florida State University.

References

External links
Bio

1945 births
2004 deaths
American players of Canadian football
Canadian football offensive linemen
Florida State Seminoles football players
Montreal Alouettes players
Ottawa Rough Riders players
People from Lake Wales, Florida
Players of American football from Florida